The Eastern University Bangladesh is a private university located in Road 6, Block B, Ashulia Model Town, Savar, Dhaka-1345.The Eastern University was established in 2003 under the Private University Act 1992, and later on approved under Private University Act of 2010. The university was set up by Eastern University Foundation - a non-profit, non-political and philanthropic organization. Its founders include academics, chartered accountants, engineers, industrialists and retired civil servants. The Foundation has 30 members. The governance of Eastern University is carried out as per the Private Universities Act of 2010 by several bodies: Board of Trustees, Syndicate, Academic Council, Curriculum Committee, Finance Committee, Teacher Selection Committee and Disciplinary Committee.

Campus
The university campus is located on Road 6, Block B, Ashulia Model Town, Savar, Dhaka-1345

Faculties and departments
The university has four faculties: Faculty of Arts, Faculty of Business Administration, Faculty of Engineering and Technology, and Faculty of Law. The Faculty of Arts has two departments – the Department of English and the Department of Applied Linguistics and ELT (English Language Teaching). The Faculty of Business Administration has four major areas, namely, Accounting, Finance, Marketing, Management, and Human Resource. A few social science courses are also offered by the faculty. The Faculty of Engineering and Technology has two departments, namely the Department of Computer Science & Information Technology and the Department of Electrical and Electronic Engineering. Approval of the Department of Textile Engineering is under consideration by UGC. The Faculty of Law has an undergraduate and postgraduate program.

List of vice-chancellors 
 Prof. Dr. Shahid Akhtar Hossain ( present )

Academics

Programmes
Faculty of Business Administration
BBA (Bachelor of Business Administration) Program
MBA (Master of Business Administration) Program
EMBA (Executive Master of Business Administration) Program

Faculty of Engineering & Technology

 B.Sc. CSE (Computer Science and Engineering)

 B.Sc. in CE (Civil Engineering)

B.Sc. EEE (Electrical and Electronic Engineering)
M.Sc. CS (Computer Science)

Approval for the B.Sc. in Textile Engineering is under consideration by UGC. Other programs to be launched include  Post-Graduate Diploma in Environment and Climate Change

Faculty of Law
Bachelor of Law (Hons.)
Master of Laws (1-year program)

Faculty of Arts
Bachelor of Arts (Hons.) in English
Master of Arts in English Language and literature
Masters in English language teaching (ELT) (1-year program)
Masters in English language teaching (ELT) (2-year program)

Faculty of Life Science

 Bachelor of Pharmacy

Curriculum
Eastern University follow the North American model of the curriculum in the fields of Business Administration, Computer Science and Electrical and Electronics Engineering; the UK model in Law and English. The academic program is pursued through a curriculum that includes splitting up of an academic year into three semesters: the Fall, the Spring and the Summer.

Session
The academic session of EU is a three-semester cycle: Spring, Summer and Fall.

Faculty members
The university has 231 full-time and part-time faculty members out of which 47 are Ph.D. including a visiting professor from the United States.

Academic exchange/link programs
The university has signed MOUs with universities abroad for credit transfer of students with financial support, student exchange, faculty exchange, research collaboration and assistance in setting up new programs. Following is a list of such universities and institutions:
Franklin University, Ohio, USA
AIS, St Helen, Auckland, New Zealand
London Premier College affiliated with London University, UK
University of Worcester, UK
Tampere University of Applied Sciences, Finland
University Malaysia Perlis (UniMAP), Malaysia
Yunnan University of Finance and Economics (YUFE), China
Management and Science University, Malaysia
Yunnan Open University (YNOU), China
Yunnan Normal University (YNNU), China

Research and publications
The university has a research center known as the Centre for Research and Development. In addition to facilitating research studies and consultancy projects, it organizes research, seminars and training on research methodology. The university publishes a biannual refereed journal - The Eastern University Journal.

Co-curricular activities
Leadership development programs.
Sports, seminars, workshops, conferences, exhibitions, concerts, competitions. 
Research.
Social awareness programs.
National and International visits. 
Publications.
Liaison with educational institutions, development organizations and other organizations at national and international levels in various events.

Notable students
Sabnam Faria, actress and model (main actress of supernatural thriller film Devi)

Footnotes
About Eastern University
International Academic Collaboration

External links
 

Private universities in Bangladesh
Universities and colleges in Dhaka